Rhiza is a genus of moths of the family Noctuidae. The genus was described by Staudinger in 1889.

Species
Subgenus Rhiza
Rhiza sergia (Püngeler, 1901) western Turkestan, Mongolia
Rhiza commoda Staudinger, 1889 Armenia, Turkestan, Mongolia
Rhiza idumaea (Püngeler, 1901) Palestine
Rhiza schlumbergeri (Püngeler, 1905) Turkestan
Rhiza stenoptera (Boursin, 1970)
Subgenus Gryphadena Kusnezov, 1908
Rhiza indigna (Christoph, 1887) Turkey
Rhiza minuta (Püngeler, 1900) southern Urals, western Kazakhstan, Turkmenistan, Afghanistan
Subgenus Graphantha Ronkay, Varga & Fábián, 1995
laciniosa species group
Rhiza laciniosa (Christoph, 1887) Turkey, Turkestan, Mongolia
Rhiza calligrapha (Ronkay & Varga, 1989)
gnorima species group
Rhiza gnorima (Püngeler, 1906)

References

Hadeninae